Joseph Stanley Okumu (born 26 May 1997) is a Kenyan professional footballer who plays as a defender for Belgian club Gent and the Kenya national team.

Club career
Okumu has played club football for Chemelil Sugar, Free State Stars and AFC Ann Arbor. At AFC Ann Arbor he made 8 league appearances in the 2018 season.

On 16 August 2018, Okumu signed for USL Championship side Real Monarchs.

On 28 August 2019, Okumu transferred to Swedish Allsvenskan side IF Elfsborg for an undisclosed fee.

He signed for Belgian club Gent on 21 June 2021 for €3.5 million.

International career
After spending time with the Kenyan under-21 and under-23 teams, he made his international debut for the senior team in 2016.

References

External link
USL Championship bio

1997 births
Living people
People from Kisumu County
Kenyan footballers
Association football defenders
Chemelil Sugar F.C. players
Free State Stars F.C. players
AFC Ann Arbor players
Real Monarchs players
IF Elfsborg players
K.A.A. Gent players
Kenyan Premier League players
South African Premier Division players
National Premier Soccer League players
USL Championship players
Kenya international footballers
2019 Africa Cup of Nations players
Kenyan expatriate footballers
Kenyan expatriate sportspeople in South Africa
Expatriate soccer players in South Africa
Kenyan expatriate sportspeople in the United States
Expatriate soccer players in the United States
Kenyan expatriate sportspeople in Sweden
Expatriate footballers in Sweden
Kenyan expatriate sportspeople in Belgium
Expatriate footballers in Belgium